This Earth Is Mine is a 1959 American drama film directed by Henry King and starring Rock Hudson and Jean Simmons.  The film portrays the lives and loves of the Rambeau family, a California winemaking dynasty trying to survive during Prohibition in the United States.

Plot
Elizabeth (Jean Simmons), an English cousin of the Rambeau family, arrives in California in 1931 for a casual visit with her aunt and uncle, only to find her future pre-determined with a pre-arranged marriage to Andre Swann, a young cousin of another branch of the family.  Another cousin, John Rambeau (Rock Hudson), disagrees with those plans, informs Elizabeth that she's being married off to consolidate the family's wine holdings, hints at  other dark secrets of the Rambeau family, and casually romances her.  Elizabeth is conflicted over the entire series of events.

The patriarch of the family, Phillipe (Claude Rains), wanting to keep the winemaking heritage of his family pure, refuses to deal with bootleggers eager for a ready-made supply of alcohol.  John, however, is not so righteous, and arranges deals with Chicago gangsters for the valley's wine supply.  Violence, gunplay, and wildfires ensue.  Elizabeth is caught in the middle, between Andre, the gentle man she is to marry (but who wants to be a priest) and John, the passionate man ready to make a deal with the devil to survive.  And John may already have started a family of his own, fathering an illegitimate child with a vineyard worker—and the woman's husband is not one to go along with the whole sordid mess.  Months, and years, of lies, blackmail and conflict follow, ending with the romantic union of John and Elizabeth, and their commitment to the Rambeau winemaking heritage.

Cast

Credited roles
 Rock Hudson played John Rambeau
 Jean Simmons played Elizabeth Rambeau
 Dorothy McGuire played  Martha Fairon
 Claude Rains played Philippe Rambeau
 Kent Smith played  Francis Fairon
 Anna Lee played Charlotte Rambeau
 Ken Scott played Luigi Griffanti
 Augusta Merighi played Mrs. Griffanti
 Francis Bethencourt played Andre Swann
 Stacy Graham played Monica
 Peter Chong played Chu
 Geraldine Wall played Maria
 Alberto Morin played Petucci
 Penny Santon played Mrs. Petucci
 Jack Mather played Dietrich
 Ben Astar played Yakowitz
 Dan White played Judge Gruber
 Lawrence Ung played David, the Chauffeur
 Robert Aiken played Tim Rambeau (as Ford Dunhill)
 Cynthia Chenault played Buz Dietrick (as Cindy Robbins)
 Don Cornell played Singer of Title Song (voice)

Uncredited roles
 George DeNormand played Ronald Fairon
 Karyn Kupcinet played Clarissa Smith
 Torben Meyer played Hugo
 Emory Parnell played Berke
 Philip Tonge played Dr. Albert Stone

Production
The screenplay for the film, based on the novel The Cup and the Sword by American novelist Alice Tisdale Hobart, was written by Casey Robinson, best known for writing most of Bette Davis' best films.  Director Henry King had been successfully directing Hollywood films since the 1920s — this film was one of his last.  Film composer Hugo Friedhofer (who had won an Oscar for Best Music for 1946's The Best Years of Our Lives) wrote the music; three-time Oscar-winner Winton C. Hoch was the cinematographer.

The production company was Vintage Productions, in partnership with Universal–International Pictures.  The film was Universal's biggest budgeted production at the time with a budget of $3 to $3.5 million. Production dates for the film were September 2, 1958 through early November, 1958.  The production was filmed in Technicolor, with monoaural sound.  Napa Valley locations used for filming were:
 Beaulieu Vineyard
 Beringer Vineyards
 Cella Vineyards
 Charles Krug Vineyards
 Christian Brothers Vineyards
 Draper Vineyard, now called La Perla and part of Spring Mountain Vineyard
 Inglenook Winery
 Italian Swiss Colony Vineyards
 Louis M. Martini Vineyards
 Mayacamas Vineyards
 Paul Masson Mountain Winery
 Schramsberg Vineyards
 Sebastiani Vineyards
 Stags' Leap Winery (name actually mentioned as part of the plot)
 Sucram Ranch
Local residents of the Napa Valley were used as extras in some scenes, and the stars were taught proper vineyard procedures by locals — a difficulty for left-handed Rock Hudson, for whom a left-handed teacher had to be found to demonstrate the proper way to attach a bud from one plant to the root of another, a scene important to the plot at the end of the film.

The New York opening of the film was June 26, 1959; the Los Angeles opening was July 8, 1959.

Critical reception
The film was not well-received. Variety wrote on January 1, 1959, "This film is almost completely lacking in dramatic cohesion. It is verbose and contradictory, and its complex plot relationships from Alice Tisdale Hobart's novel, "The Cup and the Sword" begin with confusion and end in tedium." The New York Times wrote on June 27, 1959. "In describing the intramural trials and tribulations besetting a wealthy clan of California vineyard owners, under the title "This Earth Is Mine," Universal-International has come up with an ambitious family saga as handsome as it is hollow. ... It opened yesterday at the Roxy, where the grapes stole the show."
However, the winemaking community appears to have enjoyed it:
 The film gives simple-to-understand descriptions of both the winemaking process and how to taste and appreciate wine. It’s bad melodrama, but it’s first class Napa Valley history.

See also
 List of American films of 1959

References

External links
 
 

1959 films
1959 drama films
American drama films
Universal Pictures films
CinemaScope films
Films about wine
Films about prohibition in the United States
Films scored by Hugo Friedhofer
Films set in 1931
Films set in 1932
Films directed by Henry King
1950s English-language films
1950s American films